Eric Eden Sumner (December 17, 1923 – January 19, 1993) was an Austrian-American engineer and scientist, well known for his
contributions to the early developments of switching systems.

Born in Vienna, he moved to New York City where he went to
Brooklyn Technical High School, 
earned a B.S. in mechanical engineering from Cooper Union (1948),
and M.A. degrees in physics (1953) and electrical engineering (1960) from Columbia University .
Sumner joined Bell Labs (1948) where he became leader of the group that developed the
pulse-code modulation transmission system (1955), 
and later director of transmission systems (1960) that developed the T1 carrier system (1962).
Following this, he led the underwater transmission laboratory projects on submarine surveillance systems  (1962–67),
the transmission media division  in Atlanta, Georgia (1967–71) and 
the loop division (1971-) where he oversaw development of computerized network management systems.
After retiring (1989) he served as president of the IEEE (1991) and was chairman of New Jersey Inventor's Hall of Fame.
Sumner died of heart failure.

He held eleven patents, and was elected to the National Academy of Engineering (1988).
Sumner was an IEEE Fellow and received the IEEE Alexander Graham Bell Medal
jointly with M. Robert Aaron and John S. Mayo (1978).  
The IEEE Eric E. Sumner award includes a bronze medal and was instituted in his name (1995).

References

1923 births
1993 deaths
Austrian emigrants to the United States
American electrical engineers
Scientists at Bell Labs
Fellow Members of the IEEE
Cooper Union alumni
Columbia School of Engineering and Applied Science alumni
Presidents of the IEEE Communications Society